Johanna Martzy (26 October 192413 August 1979) was a Hungarian violinist.

She was born in Timișoara, Romania in 1924 and debuted at 13. She toured in the 1940s and 1950s. After that decade her renown in North America, at least, declined and her death from cancer, in Glarus in 1979, was not well noted.

She won 1st prize at Geneva competition in 1947.

Among her chamber music recordings those of Schubert have been thought particularly special.

She was married to conductor Béla de Csillery during much of her period of renown in the 1940s and 1950s, but the marriage was dissolved in 1959.

She was referred to by Glenn Gould in his essay "We who are about to be disqualified salute you," as 
"an artist who has always seemed to me to be, at least in North America, the most underrated of the great violinists of our age."

References 

1924 births
1979 deaths
Hungarian classical violinists
Musicians from Timișoara
20th-century classical violinists
Women classical violinists
20th-century Hungarian musicians
20th-century women musicians
Deaths from cancer in Switzerland
Romanian emigrants to Hungary